Amoco Cadiz was a VLCC (very large crude carrier) owned by Amoco Transport Corp and transporting crude oil for Shell Oil. Operating under the Liberian flag of convenience, she ran aground on 16 March 1978 on Portsall Rocks,  from the coast of Brittany, France.  Ultimately she split in three and sank, resulting in the largest oil spill of its kind in history to that date.

Oil spill

On 16 March 1978 in a southwesterly gale, the Amoco Cadiz passed Ushant at the western tip of Brittany, headed for Lyme Bay in the United Kingdom. Captain Bardari shuts down the engine and attempted to make repairs, but they were not successful. Meanwhile, the wind began blowing from the northwest, driving the ship toward the coast. By the time the tugboat Pacific successfully attached a hawser, it was 2:00 pm and the Amoco Cadiz had drifted  closer to the shore. For two hours, the tugboat struggled to slow the vessel's drift, but then the towline parted. Captain Bardari turned his engines on full astern and this helped slow the ship's drift. At 7:00 pm, the captain shut down the engines so that the Pacific could try to attach another hawser. The supertanker dropped one anchor, but the flukes broke off. At this point the supertanker was drifting at  toward the Portsall Rocks. A new towline was successfully attached at 8:55 pm.

Amoco Cadiz ran aground for the first time 9:04 pm. She rode a high wave over a spire of rock which she then was impaled on. The rock cut through the plating of her bottom and thrust into the network of piping and machinery of the pump room as well as rupturing the rear wall of number-four cargo tank. The engine room was flooded. She rolled and grinded on the rock for about 5 minutes until another huge wave lifted her off and she continued her southwesterly drift pulling the Pacific after her. She drifted through a rocky maze through the Portsall Rocks and at 9:30 pm she ran aground for the second time.

The second grounding of Amoco Cadiz was on the Men Goulven rock  from the shore. She hit the reef stern first and the bottom under the engine room was opened. She pivoted round to the port and stopped with her bow pointing toward land. She came to rest with her stern impaled on a rock about 12 meters under the surface and her bow on another six to seven metres deep. Between these rocks the depth was 25 to 30 meters. The Pacific had increased her towing speed, but shortly after 22:00 pm the second tow broke.

After the second grounding the waves had broken Amoco Cadiz in two parts held together by distorted metal on the port side. By 24 March the two parts were completely torn apart and the rear section had been swung 90 degrees around from pointing south west to south east. On 25 March she was ready to break apart again and by 28 March the wreckage was further moved around by the tides and waves.

29 March she had broken in three separate pieces and it was decided to destroy her with depth charges dropped from three Super Frelon helicopters. The Navy dropped twelve Mark 56 anti-submarine grenades each containing  of high explosives set to go off  under water, and she sank some 15 minutes later. Detonation of the charges was visible as huge water fountains and shook the ground ashore more than a mile away.

Amoco Cadiz contained 1,604,500 barrels (219,797 tons) of light crude oil from Ras Tanura, Saudi Arabia and Kharg Island, Iran. Severe weather resulted in the complete breakup of the ship before any oil could be pumped out of the wreck, resulting in her entire cargo of crude oil (belonging to Shell) and 4,000 tons of fuel oil being spilled into the sea. The US NOAA estimates that the total oil spill amounted to 220,880 metric tonnes of oil.

Aftermath

In 1988 a U.S. federal judge ordered Amoco Oil Corporation to pay $85.2 million in fines; $45 million for the costs of the spill and $39 million in interest. In 1992, Amoco agreed to pay $230 million.

The site is visited by leisure divers.

See also
 – nearby and similar oil spill disaster in 1967
 – formerly Amoco Milford Haven, sister ship of Amoco Cadiz, that sank causing an oil spill disaster in 1991
List of environment topics
List of oil spills

References

External links

Oil tankers
Ships built in Spain
Shipwrecks in the English Channel
1974 ships
Amoco
Maritime incidents in 1978
Oil spills in France
Ship grounding
Cargo ships of Liberia